The Federated Computing Research Conference, FCRC, is an event that brings together several academic conferences, workshops, and plenary talks in the field of computer science. FCRC has been organised in 1993, 1996, 1999, 2003, 2007, 2011, 2015 and 2019. The 2023 event will be held in Orlando, Florida.

In the first FCRC, the main organiser was the Computing Research Association; since then, the Association for Computing Machinery has taken the lead in organising the event.

The Turing Award 1998, 2002, 2006, 2010 and 2014 recipients gave plenary talks in FCRC 1999, 2003, 2007, 2011 and 2015. Other plenary speakers in FCRC include László Babai, Charles Bennett, Randal Bryant, Bob Colwell, David Culler, Cynthia Dwork, Shafi Goldwasser, Michael J. Flynn, Hector Garcia-Molina, John L. Hennessy, Richard Karp, Randy Katz, Ken Kennedy, James Kurose, Ed Lazowska, Barbara Liskov, Robin Milner, Charles R. (Chuck) Moore, Christos Papadimitriou, Michael Rabin, Scott Shenker, Burton Smith, Guy L. Steele Jr., Avi Wigderson, Maurice Wilkes, William A. Wulf.

Locations 

 1993: San Diego, California, USA
 1996: Philadelphia, Pennsylvania, USA
 1999: Atlanta, Georgia, USA
 2003: San Diego, California, USA
 2007: San Diego, California, USA
 2011: San Jose, California, USA
 2015: Portland, Oregon, USA
 2019: Phoenix, Arizona, USA
 2023: Orlando, Florida

Conferences 

The following table contains conferences that have been part of FCRC at least twice; workshops have not been listed.

Other notable events held in conjunction with FCRC include HOPL III, the History of Programming Languages Conference in 2007.

References and Notes

 FCRC 1993 program (a PostScript file, reverse page order).
 Information about FCRC 1993 can be found also in the following posts in Usenet news (links to Google Groups):
 PPoPP 1993 program.
 PPoPP 1993 CFP.
 SoCG 1993 CFP.
 WOPA 1993 program.
 FCRC 1996 web site.
 FCRC 1999 web site.
 FCRC 2003 web site.
 FCRC 2007 web site.
 FCRC 2011 web site.
 FCRC 2015 web site.
 FCRC 2019 web site.
 FCRC 1999 on CRA web site.
 Erik Demaine's List of Events: FCRC.

External links
 

Computer science conferences
Association for Computing Machinery conferences